Panikos Eyripidou (born 17 September 1955) is a Cypriot judoka. He competed in the men's half-heavyweight event at the 1980 Summer Olympics.

References

1955 births
Living people
Cypriot male judoka
Olympic judoka of Cyprus
Judoka at the 1980 Summer Olympics
Place of birth missing (living people)